Cinderella is a 2021 romantic musical film based on the fairy tale of the same name by Charles Perrault. Written and directed by Kay Cannon, it stars singer Camila Cabello as the title character in her acting debut, alongside Idina Menzel, Minnie Driver, Nicholas Galitzine, Billy Porter, and Pierce Brosnan. It is a jukebox musical, featuring pop and rock hits, in addition to several original songs.

Development on the film began in April 2019, when Sony Pictures announced a musical-style film of Cinderella, with Cannon writing and directing. The film was produced by James Corden, through Fulwell 73 with Leo Pearlman, Jonathan Kadin, and Shannon McIntosh. Principal photography began in February 2020 at Pinewood Studios, and was suspended in March 2020 due to the COVID-19 pandemic. Production resumed in August 2020 and concluded in September.

Cinderella was released in select theaters and digitally on Amazon Prime Video on September 3, 2021. The film received mixed reviews from critics. Commercialy, according to Samba TV, the film was watched in 1.1 million U.S. households over its four-day Labor Day weekend debut and in 2.2 million households by the end of its first 30 days. According to the analytics company Screen Engine, Cinderella was the most-watched streaming movie during its opening weekend, as well as the most-watched movie musical of 2021.

Plot 
Cinderella is an ambitious young woman who wants to establish her shop "Dresses by Ella". One day in her patriarchal society, she catches the eye of Prince Robert in the guard-changing ceremony. The next day, Robert, dressed as a commoner, goes to the market, where he finds Ella trying to sell her dress. After some playful banter, he buys it for three times the amount she originally asked. He later invites her to the ball being held two weeks later, with the promise of introducing her to various people from the world to sell her dresses to.

When the day arrives, Ella is getting ready when her stepmother, Vivian throws ink on her dress and tells her that only her stepsisters Malvolia and Narissa, can attend, since Thomas the vegetable merchant has already confirmed his desire for Ella's hand. Ella is sad, but her fairy godparent, Fab G, magically appears and dresses her in a design of Ella's, with glass shoes, and turns mice into footmen and a crate into a carriage. Ella goes to the ball and meets Tatiana, a visiting queen who offers to take her around the world as a dressmaker for her and asks to meet her the next day in the market square. Later, Robert finds Ella, shows his sister, Princess Gwen wearing the gown he bought from Ella previously and proposes to Ella. Ella refuses, however, as she wants to start her career. She tells him that if she marries him it will be the end of her dream and Robert from his small age wanted to become the king and he also is not ready to accept this. At the stroke of midnight, she leaves the ball after throwing her shoe at one of the King's attendants, who tries to catch her.

The next day, Vivian tells Ella her life story...that she was also an ambitious girl like Ella and had even gotten an opportunity to learn piano in a reputed music school. She left home to study and when she came back home her husband divorced her, saying that she is not a suitable wife and kicked her and her daughters out. While she was about leave Ella's room she finds Ella's glass slipper and, on knowing the truth that her stepdaughter is the mystery princess, tries to convince Ella to marry Robert. When Ella refuses, Vivian gives her to Thomas.

Robert's mother, Queen Beatrice, helps his father, King Rowan, understand that it will be right to let him marry a commoner. The king thinks of these words and allows the prince to marry his love. Rowan even gives him the glass slipper. Robert keeps searching for Ella and finds her running in the forest after she escapes from Thomas. They profess their love for each other and kiss. Ella and Robert reach the market in time to show her designs to her benefactor, who accepts them and asks Ella to travel with her.

Robert introduces Ella to Rowan and Beatrice and informs them of their decision to travel the world. He knows this will ruin the plan for his future ascension to the throne, but Beatrice smiles as Rowan proudly declares that Gwen (who has repeatedly shown an interest and ability in affairs of state), will now be first in line to the throne. Citizens of the kingdom gather to witness the ceremony announcing the Princess' position and that Robert and Ella are in love.

Cast 

 Camila Cabello as Cinderella
 Idina Menzel as Vivian, the stepmother
 Minnie Driver as Queen Beatrice
 Nicholas Galitzine as Prince Robert
 Billy Porter as Fab G
 Pierce Brosnan as King Rowan
 Maddie Baillio as Malvolia
 Charlotte Spencer as Narissa
 James Corden as James the Mouse
 James Acaster as John the Mouse
 Romesh Ranganathan as Romesh the Mouse
 Tallulah Greive as Princess Gwen
 Beverley Knight as Queen Tatiana
 Doc Brown as Town crier
 Rob Beckett as Thomas Cecil
 Jenet Le Lacheur as Wilbur
 Fra Fee as Hench
 Luke Latchman as Griff
 Mary Higgins as Princess Laura
 Nakai Warikandwa as Princess Nakai
 Nandi Bushell as Drummer Girl
 Manny Tsakanika as Jesse the Farm Boy (uncredited)

Production 
In April 2019, Columbia Pictures announced a musical retelling of "Cinderella", with Kay Cannon writing and directing. The idea to reinterpret "Cinderella" came from James Corden, who produced the film through Fulwell 73 with Leo Pearlman, Jonathan Kadin, and Shannon McIntosh.

In April 2019, Camila Cabello was attached in the role of Cinderella. In October 2019, it was announced that talks were underway with Idina Menzel (voice of Elsa in Disney's Frozen) as Cinderella's stepmother, and Billy Porter for the role of fairy godparent. In December 2019, Nicholas Galitzine was added to the cast as Prince Robert.

Principal photography began in February 2020 at Pinewood Studios in the United Kingdom. Filming was suspended in March 2020 due to the COVID-19 pandemic. Production resumed in August 2020 and concluded in September.

Cinderella's carriage was designed to promote Mercedes Benz.

Music

Soundtrack

In April 2019, it was announced that Camila Cabello was working on the soundtrack for the film. In October, 2020, Idina Menzel confirmed that "[she and Camila] both have original songs as well." On August 2, 2021, it was announced by the director that the soundtrack would be released on September 3, 2021.

Film score

In February 2021, Jessica Rose Weiss confirmed that she and Mychael Danna were working on the film score, and recording the score with orchestra led by Johannes Vogel at Synchron Stage Vienna. The film score was released digitally by Sony Classical on September 3.

Marketing 
As part of the film's marketing, Amazon Prime Video partnered with Mercedes-Benz in August 2021. On August 9, Japanese shoes brand Onitsuka Tiger announced the release of a limited edition sneakers created in collaboration with Cinderella. On August 11, hair brand John Frieda announced a collaboration with Cinderella.

Release 
Cinderella was released in select theaters and digitally in 240 territories via Amazon Prime Video on September 3, 2021. It had a premiere event on August 30, 2021, at the Greek Theatre in Los Angeles. Samba TV reported that 1.1 million American households streamed the film over its first four days of release, while Amazon claimed it was the most-watched VOD title over the same frame.

In June 2019, Sony scheduled the film for release February 5, 2021. In January 2021, the release date was pushed back to July 16, 2021. In May 2021, Sony cancelled the film's theatrical debut and announced that the film had been bought by Amazon Studios except China, Sony would also retain home entertainment and linear television rights to the film.

Home media
Cinderella was released on Blu-ray, DVD, and Digital HD on June 21, 2022 by Sony Pictures Home Entertainment.

Reception

Audience viewership
According to Samba TV, the film was watched in 1.1 million U.S. households over its four-day Labor Day weekend debut and in 2.2 million households by the end of its first 30 days. According to the analytics company Screen Engine, Cinderella was the most-watched streaming movie during its opening weekend, as well as the most-watched movie musical yet in 2021.

Critical response

On review aggregator Rotten Tomatoes, the film holds an approval rating of 42% based on 136 reviews, with an average rating of 4.9/10. The website's critics consensus reads, "This singalong-worthy Cinderella sprinkles some modern fairy dust on the oft-told tale, but flat performances and clunky dialogue make watching often feel like a chore." On Metacritic, it has a weighted average score of 41 out of 100 based on reviews from 30 critics, indicating "mixed or average reviews".

Richard Roeper of the Chicago Sun-Times gave the film 3 out of 4 stars and praised Cabello for her performance, saying "she has a real knack for comedy" and described the film as having an "upbeat, breezy and sentimental style, laced with some sharp humor and filled with familiar and catchy pop tunes refashioned to fit the storyline." Jonathan Sim of ComingSoon.net wrote, "It's a progressively charming take on a romantic tale, and there are sweet, romantic moments throughout the film, even if there isn't much you haven't seen before."

Courtney Howard of Variety called it a "mediocre musical" and despite some praise for the innovation, she was critical of many of the creative choices, the inconsistent pacing, the character development, and said it felt both "underdeveloped and overstuffed" at the same time.

Notes

References

External links 
 
 

2021 films
2021 romantic comedy films
2020s musical comedy films
2020s romantic musical films
Amazon Studios films
American musical comedy films
American romantic comedy films
American romantic musical films
Columbia Pictures films
Film productions suspended due to the COVID-19 pandemic
Films about fairies and sprites
Films about orphans
Films about princesses
Films about royalty
Films about weddings
Films about wish fulfillment
Films based on Charles Perrault's Cinderella
Films not released in theaters due to the COVID-19 pandemic
Films scored by Mychael Danna
Films shot at Pinewood Studios
Jukebox musical films
Sony Pictures films
Amazon Prime Video original films
2020s English-language films
2020s American films